Viorel Gherciu (born 29 November 1969) was the Minister of Agriculture and Food Industry of the Republic of Moldova.

Note

1969 births
Living people
Politicians from Chișinău
Government ministers of Moldova